Presidential elections were held in Colombia on 10 February 1918. The result was a victory for Marco Fidel Suárez of the Conservative Party, who received 53% of the vote. Fidel took office on 7 August.

Although opponent Guillermo Valencia was also a member of the Conservative Party, he received support from the Liberal Party.

Results

References

Presidential elections in Colombia
1918 in Colombia
Colombia
February 1918 events
Election and referendum articles with incomplete results